17 King Street  is a historic building on King Street in the English city of Bristol.  Along with the adjacent 18 King Street, it houses a public house called The Famous Royal Naval Volunteer.

17 King Street dates from 1665 and has been designated by English Heritage as a grade II* listed building.

References

Houses completed in 1665
Grade II* listed pubs in Bristol
1665 establishments in England